This is the list of episodes for Late Night with Jimmy Fallon in 2012.

2012

January

February

March

April

May

June

July

August

September

October

November

December

References

External links
 
 Lineups at Interbridge 

Late Night with Jimmy Fallon 2012
Late Night with Jimmy Fallon 2012
Episodes (2012)